The God of Small Things is a family drama novel written by Indian writer Arundhati Roy. Roy's debut novel, it is a story about the childhood experiences of fraternal twins whose lives are destroyed by the "Love Laws" prevalent in 1960s Kerala, India. The novel explores how small, seemingly insignificant things shape people's behavior and their lives. The novel also explores the lingering effects of casteism in India. It won the Booker Prize in 1997.

The God of Small Things was Roy's first book and only novel until the 2017 publication of The Ministry of Utmost Happiness twenty years later. She began writing the manuscript for The God of Small Things in 1992 and finished four years later, in 1996. It was published the following year. The potential of the story was first recognized by Pankaj Mishra, an editor with HarperCollins, who sent it to three British publishers. Roy received £500,000 in advance and rights to the book were sold in 21 countries.

Plot

The story is set in Aymanam, part of Kottayam district in Kerala, India. The novel has a disjointed narrative; the temporal setting shifts back and forth between 1969, when fraternal twins Rahel, a girl, and Esthappen, a boy, are seven years old, and 1993, when the twins are reunited.

Ammu Ipe is desperate to escape her ill-tempered father, known as Pappachi, and her bitter, long-suffering mother, known as Mammachi. She leaves Ayemenem, and to avoid returning, she marries a man only known by the name of Baba in Calcutta. She later discovers that he is an alcoholic, and he physically abuses her and tries to pimp her to his boss. Ammu gives birth to Estha and Rahel, leaves her husband, and returns to Ayemenem to live with her parents and brother, Chacko. Chacko has returned to India from England following his divorce from an English woman, Margaret, and the subsequent death of Pappachi.

The multi-generational, Syrian Christian family home in Ayemenem also includes Pappachi's sister, Navomi Ipe, known as Baby Kochamma. As a young girl, Baby Kochamma fell in love with Father Mulligan, a young Irish priest who had come to Ayemenem. To get closer to him, Baby Kochamma converted to Roman Catholicism and joined a convent against her father's wishes. After a few months in the convent, she realized that her vows brought her no closer to the man she loved. Her father eventually rescued her from the convent and sent her to America for education. Because of her unrequited love for Father Mulligan, Baby Kochamma remained unmarried for the rest of her life, becoming deeply bitter over time. Throughout the book, she delights in the misfortune of others and constantly manipulates events to bring calamity.

The death of Margaret's second husband Joe in a car accident prompts Chacko to invite her and their daughter, Sophie, to spend Christmas in Ayemenem. 
On the road to the airport to pick up Margaret and Sophie, the family visits a theater, and on the way, they encounter a group of Communist protesters who surround the car and humiliate Baby Kochamma. Rahel thinks she sees amongst the protesters Velutha, a servant who works for the family's pickle factory, Paradise Pickles and Preserve, and does extra chores for Mammachi.  Later at the theater, Estha is sexually molested by the "Orangedrink Lemondrink Man", a vendor working at the snack counter. Estha's traumatic experience factors into the tragic events at the heart of the narrative.

Rahel's assertion that she saw Velutha in the Communist mob, causes Baby Kochamma to associate Velutha with her humiliation at the protesters' hands, and she begins to harbor enmity toward him.  Rahel and Estha form an unlikely bond with Velutha and come to love him. Ammu soon gets attracted to Velutha mainly because of her children's love towards him, and eventually, they begin a short-lived romantic affair. Velutha is a Dalit, the lowest caste, meaning his romance with Ammu is forbidden, and culminates in tragedy for the family.

When her relationship with Velutha gets exposed by Velutha's father, Vellya Paapen, Ammu is locked in her room and Velutha is banished. In a fit of rage, Ammu blames the twins for her misfortune and calls them "millstones around her neck."  Distraught, Estha and Rahel decide to escape. Their cousin, Sophie also joins them. During the night, as they try to reach the History House, an abandoned house across the river, their boat capsizes and Sophie drowns. When Margaret and Chacko return from a trip where they had gone to arrange Margaret's and Sophie's return trips, they see Sophie's corpse laid out on the sofa.

Baby Kochamma goes to the police and accuses Velutha of being responsible for Sophie's death. A group of policemen hunt Velutha down, savagely beat him for crossing caste lines, and arrest him on the brink of death. The twins, huddling in the abandoned house, witness the horrific scene. Later, when they reveal the truth to the chief of police Thomas Mathew, he is alarmed. Not unknown to the fact that Velutha is a Communist, he is afraid that if word gets out that the arrest and beating were wrongful, it will cause unrest among the local Communists led by Comrade K.N.M Pillai. Mathew threatens to hold Baby Kochamma responsible for falsely accusing Velutha. To save herself, Baby Kochamma tricks Estha and Rahel into believing that the two of them would be implicated as having murdered Sophie out of jealousy and would surely be incarcerated with Ammu. She thus convinces them to lie to the inspector that Velutha had abducted them and had murdered Sophie. Velutha dies of his injuries overnight.

After Sophie's funeral, Ammu goes to the police to tell the truth about her relationship with Velutha. Afraid of being exposed, Baby Kochamma convinces Chacko that Ammu and the twins were responsible for his daughter's death. Chacko kicks Ammu out of the house and forces her to send Estha to live with his father. Estha never sees Ammu again. Ammu dies alone in a motel a few years later at the age of 31.

After a turbulent childhood and adolescence in India, Rahel gets married and goes to America. There, she divorces before returning to Ayemenem after years of working dead-end jobs. Estha and Rahel, now 31, are reunited for the first time since they were children. They had been haunted by their guilt and their grief-ridden pasts. Toward the end of the novel, Estha and Rahel engage in incestuous sex, and it's said that "what they shared that night was not happiness, but hideous grief." The novel comes to an end with a nostalgic recounting of Ammu and Velutha's love affair.

Characters

Estha

Estha, which is short for Esthappen Yako, is Rahel's twin brother. He is a serious, intelligent, and somewhat nervous child who wears "beige and pointy shoes" and has an "Elvis puff". His experience of the circumstances surrounding Sophie's visit is somewhat more traumatic than Rahel's, beginning when he is sexually abused by a man at a theater. The narrator emphasizes that Estha's "Two Thoughts" in the pickle factory, stemming from this experience—that "Anything can happen to Anyone" and that "It's best to be prepared"—are critical in leading to his cousin's death.

Estha is the twin chosen by Baby Kochamma, because he is more "practical" and "responsible", to go into Velutha's cell at the end of the book and condemn him as his and Rahel's abductor. This trauma, in addition to the trauma of being shipped (or "Returned") to Calcutta to live with his father, contributes to Estha's becoming mute at some point in his childhood. He never goes to college and acquires a number of habits, such as wandering on very long walks and obsessively cleaning his clothes. He is so close to his sister that the narrator describes them as one person, despite having been separated for most of their lives. He is repeatedly referred to as "Silent" as he gradually slips into an unbreakable silence after he is Returned.

Rahel

Rahel is the partial narrator of the story, and is Estha's younger sister by 18 minutes. As a girl of seven, her hair sits "on top of her head like a fountain" in a "Love-in-Tokyo" band, and she often wears red-tinted plastic sunglasses with yellow rims. An intelligent and straightforward person who has never felt socially comfortable, she is impulsive and wild, and it is implied that everyone but Velutha treats her as somehow lesser than her brother. In later life, she becomes something of a drifter; several times, the narrator refers to her "Emptiness". After the tragedy that forms the core of the story, she remains with her mother, later training as an architectural draftsman and engaging in a failed relationship with an American, elements of which parallel the author's own life story.

Ammu

Ammu is Rahel's and Estha's mother. She married their father (referred to as Baba) only to get away from her family. He was an alcoholic, and she divorced him when he started to be violent toward her and her children. She went back to Ayemenem, where people avoided her on the days when the radio played "her music" and she got a wild look in her eyes. When the twins are seven, she has an affair with Velutha. This relationship is one of the cataclysmic events in the novel. She is a strict mother, and her children worry about losing her love.

Velutha

Velutha is a Paravan, an Untouchable, who is exceptionally smart and works as a carpenter at the Ipe family's pickle factory. His name means white in Malayalam, because he is so dark. He returns to Ayemenem to help his father, Vellya Paapen, take care of his brother, who was paralyzed in an accident. He is an active member of the local Communist movement. Velutha is extremely kind to the twins, and has an affair with Ammu for which he is brutally punished.Velutha has one brother, Kuttapen, who is forever bedridden because of his paralysis from the chest downwards. 

Chacko

Chacko is Estha's and Rahel's maternal uncle. He is four years elder to Ammu. He meets Margaret in his final year at Oxford and marries her afterward. They have a daughter, Sophie, whose death in Ayemenem is central to the story.

Baby Kochamma

Baby Kochamma is the twins' maternal great aunt. She maintains an attitude of superiority because of her education as a garden designer in the United States and her burning, unrequited love for an Irish Catholic priest, her relationship with whom is the only meaningful event in her life. Her own emptiness and failure spark bitter spite for her niece's children, further driven by her prudish code of conventional values. Her spite ultimately condemns the twins, the lovers, and herself to a lifetime of misery.

Themes

Indian history and politics
Indian history and politics shape the plot and meaning of The God of Small Things in a variety of ways. Some of Roy's commentary is on the surface, with jokes and snippets of wisdom about political realities in India. However, the novel also examines the historical roots of these realities and develops profound insights into the ways in which human desperation and desire emerge from the confines of a firmly entrenched caste society.

Caste relations and cultural tensions
In addition to her commentary on Indian history and politics, Roy evaluates the Indian post-colonial complex, or the cultural attitudes of many Indians toward their former British rulers. After Ammu calls her father a "[shit]-wiper" in Hindi for his blind devotion to the British, Chacko explains to the twins that they come from a family of Anglophiles, or lovers of British culture, "trapped outside their own history and unable to retrace their steps". He goes on to say that they despise themselves because of this.

A related inferiority complex is evident in the interactions between Untouchables and Touchables in Ayemenem. Vellya Paapen is an example of an Untouchable so grateful to the Touchable caste that he is willing to kill his son, Velutha, when he discovers that Velutha has broken the most important rule of caste segregation—that there be no inter-caste sexual relations. In part, this reflects how many Untouchables have internalized caste segregation. Nearly all of the relationships in the novel are somehow colored by cultural and caste tension, including the twins' relationship with Sophie, Chacko's relationship with Margaret, Pappachi's relationship with his family, and Ammu's relationship with Velutha. Characters such as Baby Kochamma and Pappachi are the most rigid and vicious in their attempts to uphold that social code, while Ammu and Velutha are the most unconventional and daring in unraveling it. Roy implies that this is why they are punished so severely for their transgression.

Forbidden love

One interpretation of Roy's theme of forbidden love is that love is such a powerful and uncontrollable force that it cannot be contained by any conventional social code. Another is that conventional society somehow seeks to destroy real love, which is why love in the novel is consistently connected to loss, death, and sadness. Also, because all romantic love in the novel relates closely to politics and history, it is possible that Roy is stressing the connection of personal desire to larger themes of history and social circumstances. Love would therefore be an emotion that can be explained only in terms of two peoples' cultural backgrounds and political identities.

Social discrimination
The story is set in the caste society of India, at a time when members of the Untouchable Paravan or Paryan caste were not permitted to touch members of higher castes or enter their houses. The Untouchables were considered polluted beings. They had the lowliest jobs and lived in subhuman conditions. In India, the caste system was considered a way to organize society. Roy's book shows how terribly cruel such a system can be.

Along with the caste system, readers see an economic class struggle. The Ipes are considered upper class. They are factory owners, the dominating class. Mammachi and Baby Kochamma would not deign to mix with those of a lower class.

However, Roy shows other types of less evident discrimination. For example, there is religious discrimination. It is unacceptable for a Syrian Christian to marry a Hindu and vice versa, and Hindus can only marry a Hindu from the same caste. In more than one passage of the book, the reader feels Rahel's and Estha's discomfort at being half Hindu. Baby Kochamma constantly makes disparaging comments about Hindus. On the other hand, there is discomfort even between Christian denominations as is shown by Pappachi's negative reaction when Baby Kochamma converts to Catholicism.

Chacko suffers more veiled racial discrimination, as it seems his daughter also does. His English wife's parents were shocked and disapproving that their daughter would marry an Indian, no matter how well educated. Sophie, at one point, mentions to her cousins that they are all "wog", while she is "half-wog".

The Ipes are very class-conscious and feel a need to maintain their status. Discrimination is a way of protecting their privileged position in society.

Betrayal

Betrayal is a constant element in this story. Love, ideals, and confidence are all forsaken, consciously and unconsciously, innocently and maliciously, and these deceptions affect all of the characters deeply.

Baby Kochamma is capable of lying and double-crossing anyone whom she sees as a threat to her social standing. This is a consequence of her loss of respectability after becoming a Roman Catholic nun to be close to Father Mulligan, despite her father's disapproval. Her fear is reminiscent of that of Comrade Pillai, who betrays both Velutha and Chacko to further his own interests and that of his political party.

The greatest tragedy is that of Velutha, the only truly non-corrupt adult in the story, who becomes the repeated victim of everyone's deception—from Comrade Pillai's to Baby Kochamma's, to his own father's and, most heartbreakingly, that of Estha, who at seven years old is manipulated into accusing Velutha of crimes that he did not commit.

Misogyny and women in India

Another important aspect of social discrimination that Roy deals with is misogyny, mainly through the character of Ammu. She often draws attention to the different opportunities on offer for women and men in India and the fact that, since Ammu has been married and divorced, she sees her life as effectively over. This is one of the main factors that influences her to start her love affair with Velutha. We also see her treatment by a police officer, who taps her breasts with his baton as "though he was choosing mangoes from a basket", commenting on objectification of women.

Style

Non-sequential narrative
The God of Small Things is not written in a sequential narrative style in which events unfold chronologically. Instead, the novel is a patchwork of flashbacks and lengthy sidetracks that weave together to tell the story of the Ipe family. The main events of the novel are traced back through the complex history of their causes, and memories are revealed as they relate to one another thematically and as they might appear in Rahel's mind. Although the narrative voice is omniscient, it is loosely grounded in Rahel's perspective, and all of the episodes of the novel progress toward the key moments in Rahel's life.

Point of view
The book is narrated in the third person. However, during a great part of the narrative, the reader sees everything through Rahel's eyes. This gives the reader special insight into the happenings and characters. Throughout the book, there are various moments that intersect. In one moment, everything is seen through a child's eyes, with a child's feelings and rationales. Later, the same facts, objects, and people are seen in a completely different light.

Setting
The story is set in the village of Ayemenem in the Kottayam district of Kerala, India. The main part of the plot takes place in 1969, a time of changes in ideology and influence.

India is a very complex society with various cultural and religious habits and beliefs. Hindus, Buddhists, Sikhs, Christians, and Muslims share the same space. Society is divided not only by the very strict caste system but also by class consciousness. Many languages are spoken in India, but the higher classes make a point of speaking English, sending their sons to study in England and adopting certain English habits. Kerala itself, where the story is set, has a complex social setup, with Hindus, Muslims, and Christians displaying different lifestyles and traditions. It also has the largest Christian population in India, predominantly Saint Thomas Christians or Syrian Christians. In the Kottayam district, Christians are a majority.

Roy has described the book as "an inextricable mix of experience and imagination".

Techniques
Roy uses various techniques to represent the children's viewpoints and their innocence. One technique she employs is the capitalization of certain words and phrases to give them significance (i.e Because Anything Can Happen To Anyone). The children also restate things that adults say in a phonetic way, separating and recombining words. This echoes the children's way of looking at the world, distinct from the perspective of the grown-ups who surround them. Roy often uses metaphors that feature elements that are more prominent in the lives of children, such as toothpaste, secrets, or portable pianos. They place significance on words and ideas differently from the adults, thereby creating a new way of viewing the world around them. They pick up on certain feelings and ideas that the adults around them either fail or refuse to recognize, and give new significance to things that the adults ignore for their own purposes. The children use and repeat these phrases throughout the story so that the phrases themselves gain independence and representational meanings. Another way she plays with language is to join words together without punctuation, which we see in the description of the 'Orangedrink Lemondrink man' or 'bluegreyblue eyes'. This subversion of the usual rules of syntax and grammar not only places us in a child's view of the world, but it also draws attention to the role of language in colonialism. By corrupting standard use of English (the colonial language of India) Roy is rebelling against colonial influence still present in India, represented by characters such as Margaret Kochamma and Chacko who always speak correctly.

Roy also employs a disjointed, non-sequential narrative style that echoes the process of memory, especially the resurfacing of a previously suppressed, painful memory. The story of three different generations is told simultaneously going back and forth in time.

The uncovering of the story of Sophie's death, concurrently with the forward-moving story of Rahel's return to Ayemenem and reunion with Estha, creates a complex narrative that emphasizes the difficulty of the subject of the story and the complexity of the culture from which the story originates. Time is rendered somewhat static as parts of one narrative line are intertwined through repetition and non-sequential discovery. This is also part of the way Roy uses real-life places and people that she has shifted and altered for use in the story. The story's many elements come together to construct a diverse look at one instance of Indian culture and the effect of the caste system on life and love during a time of post-colonialism. As the children try to form their own identities, naming and renaming themselves in the process, Roy places in parallel the effect of the process by intertwining the past and the present.

This process also echoes the progression of the Indian people, like that of all cultures that try to find ways to maintain their traditions in a time of increasing globalization.

Possible autobiographical elements 
The God of Small Things is a work of fiction but some critics have tried to find autobiographical parallels in the novel, while at the same, warning against drawing any simplistic connections between the novel and the writer's life. Some of the similarities between Roy's life and that of the characters she creates include her own Syrian Christian and Hindu lineage; the divorce of her parents when she and her brother were very young; her return to the family home in Ayemenem after her mother's divorce; and her education in an architectural school, to name a few. Some critics also attribute the political awareness manifested in The God of Small Things to Roy's early life-influences from her mother, who was an activist and feminist.

Reception
The God of Small Things received stellar reviews in major American newspapers such as The New York Times (a "dazzling first novel", "extraordinary", "at once so morally strenuous and so imaginatively supple") and the Los Angeles Times ("a novel of poignancy and considerable sweep"), and in Canadian publications such as the Toronto Star ("a lush, magical novel"). Time named it one of the best books of the year. Critical response in the United Kingdom was less positive, and the awarding of the Booker Prize caused controversy; Carmen Callil, a 1996 Booker Prize judge, called the novel "execrable", and The Guardian described the contest as "profoundly depressing". In India, the book was criticised especially for its unrestrained description of sexuality by E. K. Nayanar, then Chief Minister of Roy's home state Kerala, where she had to answer charges of obscenity. The book has since been translated into Malayalam by Priya A. S., under the title Kunju Karyangalude Odeythampuran. 
 Some critics have pointed out that the reader reviews of this book on bookseller websites are so extremely opposed at times that it is difficult to imagine readers are saying this about the same book.

In 2014, the novel was ranked in The Telegraph as one of the 10 all-time greatest Asian novels. On 5 November 2019, the BBC News listed The God of Small Things on its list of the 100 most influential novels. Emma Lee-Potter of The Independent listed it as one of the 12 best Indian novels.

In 2022, the novel was included on the "Big Jubilee Read" list of 70 books by Commonwealth authors, selected to celebrate the Platinum Jubilee of Elizabeth II.

In popular culture
In 2013, Talkhiyaan, a Pakistani television series based on the novel, was aired on Express Entertainment.

The band Darlingside credits the novel as the inspiration for their song "The God of Loss".

See also
 Caste system in India

References

 Ch'ien, Evelyn. "The Politics of Design: Arundhati Roy".  In Weird English.  Harvard University Press, 2004.

Further reading
 Arundhati Roy's The God of Small Things: Critique and Commentary, by R. S. Sharma, Shashi Bala Talwar. Published by Creative Books, 1998. .
 Explorations: Arundhati Roy's the God of small things, by Indira Bhatt, Indira Nityanandam. Published by Creative Books, 1999. .
 The God of Small Things: A Saga of Lost Dreams, by K. V. Surendran. Published by Atlantic Publishers & Distributors, 2000. . Excerpts
 Arundhati Roy's The God of small things: a reader's guide, by Julie Mullaney. Published by Continuum International Publishing Group, 2002. .
 Reading Arundhati Roy's The God of Small Things, by Carole Froude-Durix, Jean-Pierre Durix. Published by Editions universitaires de Dijon, 2002. ,.
 Arundhati Roy's The god of small things: a critical appraisal, by Amar Nath Prasad. Published by Sarup & Sons, 2004. .
 Derozio To Dattani: Essays in Criticism, by Sanjukta Das. Published by Worldview Publications, 2009. 
 The God of Small Things: A Novel of Social Commitment, by Amitabh Roy. Published by Atlantic Publishers & Distributors, 2005. . Excerpts
 Arundhati Roy's The god of small things, by Alex Tickell. Published by Routledge, 2007. . Excerpts
 Caste and The God of Small Things Emory University.
 The God of Small Things, Chapter One – Paradise Pickles and Preserves The New York Times

External links

 Arundhati Roy discusses The God of Small Things on the BBC World Book Club

1997 debut novels
1997 Indian novels
1997 novels
Booker Prize-winning works
Culture of Kottayam district
Fiction set in 1969
Fiction set in 1993
Incest in fiction
Indian English-language novels
Indian novels adapted into television shows
Nonlinear narrative novels
Novels by Arundhati Roy
Novels set in Kerala
Postcolonial novels
Postmodern novels